

Ob 
Obrenovac, Obri

Odž 
Odžaci, Odžak

Op 
Opličići

Or 
Orah (municipality Ravno), Orahov Do (municipality Ravno), Orahovica, Orahovice, Orašje Popovo (municipality Ravno) (part)  Orlište, Oručevac

Os 
Osanica, Osječani, Ostrožac, Ostružno

Oš 
Ošanjići (municipality Stolac(BiH))

Ot 
Oteležani

Ov 
Ovčari

Oz 
Ozrenovići

Lists of settlements in the Federation of Bosnia and Herzegovina (A-Ž)